Ophidonais is a genus of annelids belonging to the family Naididae.

The species of this genus are found in Eurasia and America.

Species:
 Ophidonais serpentina (Müller, 1773) 
 Ophidonais vermicularis Gervais, 1838

References

Naididae